Balamut is a 1978 Soviet comedy film directed by Vladimir Rogovoy.

Plot 
The film tells about the growing up of young people, one of which is the determined and passionate Pyotr  Gorokhov, who is called Balamut.

Cast 
 Vadim Andreev as Pyotr Gorokhov
 Natalya Kaznacheeva as Anya
 Nikolay Denisov as Sanya
 Vladimir Shikhov as Ogorodnikov
 Valentina Klyagina as Katya
 Otkam Iskenderov as Maksud
 Viktor Shulgin as Panteley Fedorovich
 Noris Polastre as Noris
 Yevgeny Karelskikh as Serebryakov
 Larisa Blinova as Sinyakina
 Yevgeniya Simonova as Valentina Nikolaevna Romashova
 Yuri Sarantsev as dean Alexey Ivanovich
 Vadim Zakharchenko as Kireev
 Roman Filippov a Fyodor Paramonov
 Yuri Chernov as  Zubkov

References

External links 
 

1978 films
1970s Russian-language films
Soviet comedy films
Films directed by Vladimir Rogovoy
1978 comedy films
Soviet teen films
Gorky Film Studio films
Films set in Moscow
Films shot in Moscow